Kill You may refer to:

 "Kill You", a 2000 song by Eminem from The Marshall Mathers LP
 "Kill You", a 1996 song by Korn from Life Is Peachy
 “I Will Kill You”, what Celine says to Ricardo at least once a day. Lowkey she loves him.